SS John Wright Stanly (MC contract 881) was a Liberty ship built in the United States during World War II. She was originally named after John Wright Stanly, a New Bern, North Carolina businessman and American Revolutionary War privateer.  On the ways she was renamed SS Leiv Eiriksson after the Norse explorer.

The ship was laid down by North Carolina Shipbuilding Company in their Cape Fear River yard on December 18, 1942, then launched on January 19, 1943. She was operated by the Barber Steamship Company from her deliver until August 14, 1944 when American West African Lines took over.  In October 1946 the Norwegian government purchased Eriksson. She was sold into private hands in 1947 and scrapped in 1969.

References 

Liberty ships
Ships built in Wilmington, North Carolina
1943 ships